The Isle is a  long river in south-western France, right tributary of the Dordogne. Its source is in the north-western Massif Central, near the town Nexon (south of Limoges). It flows south-west through the following départements and towns:

 Haute-Vienne: Le Chalard
 Dordogne: Périgueux, Mussidan
 Gironde: Libourne

It flows into the Dordogne in Libourne. Among the tributaries of the Isle are the Auvézère, the Loue, the Beauronne and the Dronne.

References

Rivers of France
 
Rivers of Dordogne
Rivers of Gironde
Rivers of Haute-Vienne
Rivers of Nouvelle-Aquitaine
Nouvelle-Aquitaine region articles needing translation from French Wikipedia